Bertha of Blois (French: Berthe de Blois; c. 1005 — c. 1080), was a Duchess consort of Brittany and a countess consort of Maine.

Life
Bertha was the daughter of Odo II, Count of Blois and Ermengarde of Auvergne. In 1029, she married Alain III, Duke of Brittany, he died in 1040. In 1046, she married Hugh IV, Count of Maine.

Marriage & issue
Bertha and Alain had:
Conan II, Duke of Brittany
Hawise, Duchess of Brittany

With her second husband, Hugh IV, Count of Maine, they had:
Herbert II, Count of Maine
Marguerite (1045 - 1063), betrothed to Robert Curthose

References

Sources

Duchesses of Brittany
Countesses of Maine
1000s births
1080 deaths
People from Blois
11th-century Breton people
11th-century French women